Aleksandr Krivchinkov (born 20 January 1983) is a Russian middle-distance runner. He competed in the men's 1500 metres at the 2004 Summer Olympics.

References

1983 births
Living people
Place of birth missing (living people)
Russian male middle-distance runners
Olympic male middle-distance runners
Olympic athletes of Russia
Athletes (track and field) at the 2004 Summer Olympics
Russian Athletics Championships winners